Battle of Guararapes may refer to:

First Battle of Guararapes (1648)
Second Battle of Guararapes (1649)
Batalha dos Guararapes, an 1879 painting by Victor Meirelles